Ákos Sándor Onódi (born 2 September 2001) is a Hungarian footballer who plays as a goalkeeper for Akritas Chlorakas.

Club career

Aston Villa 
Onódi made his debut for Aston Villa on 8 January 2021 in a FA Cup match against Liverpool.

On 6 July 2021, Onódi was amongst several Academy players who were given new professional contracts. On 16 July 2021, Onódi joined Southern League Premier Division side Bromsgrove Sporting on a season-long loan. He made his debut for Bromsgrove the following day, in a 1–0 pre-season friendly victory over Romulus. His first competitive appearance for the side was a 4–0 defeat to Leiston on the opening day of the Southern League Premier season.

On 24 May 2022, Onódi announced on his social media that we would be leaving Aston Villa at the end of his current contract on 1 July. This was confirmed by the Premier League on 10 June.

Akritas Chlorakas 
On 25 August 2022, Onódi signed for Cypriot First Division club Akritas Chlorakas, revealing that he had turned down interest from clubs in England and Italy due to them wanting him to act as third-choice goalkeeper.

Personal life
Despite news reports suggesting that Ákos is the nephew of Olympic gold medal-winning gymnast Henrietta Ónodi, he has confirmed that they are not in fact related.

Career statistics

Club

Notes

References

2001 births
Living people
Hungarian footballers
Hungary youth international footballers
Hungarian expatriate footballers
Association football goalkeepers
Nemzeti Bajnokság II players
Győri ETO FC players
Aston Villa F.C. players
Hungarian expatriate sportspeople in England
Expatriate footballers in England
Sportspeople from Győr
Bromsgrove Sporting F.C. players
Southern Football League players

Hungarian expatriate sportspeople in Cyprus
Expatriate footballers in Cyprus
Akritas Chlorakas players